Batanga, Burkina Faso is a village in the Zimtenga Department of Bam Province in northern-central Burkina Faso. It has a population of 783.

References

Populated places in the Centre-Nord Region
Bam Province